Rachel Feinstein (born May 25, 1971) is an American artist who specializes in sculpture. She is best known for baroque, fantasy-inspired sculptures like "The Snow Queen", which was drawn from a Hans Christian Andersen fairy tale. There have been over two dozen group and solo showings of her work in the United States, Europe and Asia. She is married to painter John Currin. In 2011 the New York Times described them as "the ruling power couple in today's art world."

Early life
Feinstein, the daughter of a dermatologist and a nurse, was raised in Miami, Florida. Her father is Jewish and her mother Catholic. She became interested in art in elementary school and took private lessons. She also studied with her artist grandmother. She graduated with a Bachelor of Arts from Columbia University in 1993, studying religion, philosophy and studio art. In 1993 she also studied at the Skowhegan School of Painting and Sculpture in Maine. Feinstein applied for a Master of Fine Arts from Yale University, but believes she was rejected because she wore a transparent plastic miniskirt and a T-shirt reading "I'm a Satisfier" to the interview.

In New York Feinstein studied with artist Kiki Smith. She has said she was particularly inspired by the sculptors Gian Lorenzo Bernini, Pino Pascali, Elie Nadelman, Tilman Riemenschneider and Antonio Canova.

Career
In 1994 her works were shown for the first time in the Sonnabend Gallery Artist Invitational group showing. In that year she also showed at the Exit Art "Let the Artist Live" exhibit where she built a Sleeping Beauty's gingerbread house in which she actually slept.

In 1999 while working as a receptionist at the Marianne Boesky gallery, Boesky saw some of her sculpture sketches and relieved her of that position so that she could show her works. This was Feinstein's first solo show.  The gallery has had three showings of her work.

In 2002 Feinstein and Currin published a 24-page book of their works at the Hydra Workshop in Hydra, Greece which they titled The Honeymooners, John Currin and Rachel Feinstein. It includes an interview conducted by Sadie Coles.

In 2006, Feinstein displayed her work at Le Consortium in Dijon, France. In 2007 she opened her eighth solo at the Corvi-Mora gallery in London, England.

In 2008 Feinstein published a signed, limited edition full-color catalog of her works over the previous ten years. The introduction was written by author James Frey and the book includes an interview conducted by filmmaker Sofia Coppola.

In 2019 Feinstein opened her first solo museum survey in the United States, "Maiden, Mother, Crone," at the Jewish Museum in New York. The exhibition opened to the public on November 1, 2019, and was organized by Kelly Taxter, The Jewish Museum's Barnett and Annalee Newman Curator of Contemporary Art.

Feinstein's flair for fashion inspired a 2004 collection by Marc Jacobs. Juergen Teller photographed her for the advertising campaign. The Currin's apartment loft, described as "most stylish apartment south of Houston Street", was featured in the December 2010 issue of World of Interiors after S. I. Newhouse, the chairman of Condé Nast, dined at the apartment. Tom Ford included her in his show of his new women's fashion in 2010. Vogue reported on her 40th birthday party in their new town house in Gramercy Park; its theme was "Miss Havisham" and guests were bid to "Dress Edwardian."

Works
Feinstein's mediums include oil paint on glass and sculptures made of plaster and carved wood. Her work has been described as combining "Rococo and Baroque flourishes with fairy tale and Disneyesque themes" and as creating a "baroque kitsch fantasy-land". One reviewer wrote her work has "exposed (but also relied on) the ways in which flourish has been historically coded as feminine."

In 2000 Feinstein exhibited works in "Pastoral Pop" at the Whitney Museum at Philip Morris and 2000 at "The Americans" exhibition at the Barbican Centre in London. Her 2001 debut solo show was inspired by her trip to palaces in Munich and Vienna.

In 2004 she displayed her plywood sculpture "The Crucifixion" at the Friedrich Petzel Gallery. The life-sized depiction consisted of four figures: Jesus on the cross, Mary at his feet, John the Baptist and Saint John. A reviewer remarked that rather than making a joke of the scene, as several contemporary artists had done, she had produced a work that was "startling" as well as "evocative and fresh."

In 2005 she produced a show at the Boesky Gallery featuring elderly women posed in ornate costumes and wigs. She painted them in oils on ovals of glass and had them photographed. Her inspiration for the set of pieces was Miss Havisham from Great Expectations. She told an interview that being pregnant at the time, "I guess I was thinking about mortality, feminine beauty, my fears about being a mother and an artist." An Artforum reviewer noted that the costume and pose of one drawing was a "nearly identical copy" of a Feinstein photograph in a Marc Jacobs advertisement from the year before and that the elderly model in fact looked much like Ms. Feinstein might look when she aged. The reviewer wrote the "(self-)portraits" felt "in line with the current vogue for noble iconography" and also described them as "celebratory caricatures, self-indulgent and vain." She also criticized the one foam and three wood sculptures from the exhibition as "merely clunky hybrids of kitschy Cubism and craft."

In 2007 a steel gilded equestrian statue she called "Cuatro" for Don Quixote became part of the Public Art Project of Anyang, South Korea. It is six meters high.

Her 2008 show "Puritan's Delight" combined pieces displaying "disparate references to art history, cultural history, and contemporary life" and "mixed Cubism, Deconstruction, Mexican crosses, furniture-making techniques, Puritan spartanism, and Viennese elegance." Notable pieces included a woman posing erotically, two dancing satyrs, a Renaissance-era avenging angel,  wood sculptures of prancing horses with white pompadors painted in high-gloss enamel and a black stained collapsed wooden carriage holding a working lantern.

The Fashion Fund Award committee commissioned Feinstein to create their 2010 award. She created it in the form of a swan which she described as "a pure, elite thing." For the ceremony she created 20 "one-of-a-kind" awards cast in bronze.

In January 2011 she opened her show "The Snow Queen" at Lever House in New York. It combines Carpenter Gothic architecture and Baroque painting to present vignettes of Hans Christian Andersen fairy tale The Snow Queen, showing Feinstein's "flair for synthesizing myriad fascinations." The exhibited included painted wood toy soldiers, roses, children, and ice, as well as a lacquered gold coach which was displayed outside in the January snow. The Vogue magazine reviewer wrote that she "explores the themes of fantasy, ruin, and beauty to create a magical universe of her own."

In February 2012 Feinstein created for a Marc Jacobs' fashion show "a twisted paper castle set", also described as "a decayed Walt Disney castle." Rachel Feinstein referred to her work as "rococo with a nasty underside".

From November 2012 to January 2013 the Gagosian Gallery held Feinstein's first exhibition in Rome, Italy. For it she created an impressionistic panoramic wallpaper of Rome covering different historical periods, painted and displayed on mirrors and accompanied by life size wooden sculptures inspired by depictions of early Christian saints and martyrs.

Feinstein's works have been bought by some notable collectors, including Aby Rosen, Alberto Mugrabi and James Frey.

Views
Feinstein and Currin's "ritzy indulgence" has been described as a "risky move" in the art world.
Feinstein told an interviewer: 

Both believe making art is "a consummately individual expression", a view which coincides with their libertarian political leanings, which are described as "right" of the New York art world.

Feinstein has said about fashion: 

In interviews both Feinstein and Currin have commented on sexism in the art world. Feinstein has said:  She believes that she is judged unjustly by her appearance in a way her husband and other males artists are not.

Personal life 
At the 1994 "Let the Artist Live" exhibition, Feinstein met John Currin. They married three years later on Valentine's Day. She and Currin have two sons and a daughter.

Feinstein has appeared in many of Currin's paintings, both as a recognizable face and as a body model. She has been called his "muse." Her personality has been described as "warm, energetic and open." Currin, who describes himself as "not very liked," says she "helped my career tremendously."

Some have alleged that Feinstein has "piggybacked" on her husband's success, criticism that Feinstein regards as a sexist denial that she also might be talented. A photographer friend was quoted as saying that while Currin seems "very macho and old-fashioned" and Feinstein "super-feminine," artistically he does very fine work with brushes while she uses a chainsaw and goggles in her studio. She opined that their blurred yin and yang is the "key to their mystique."

Exhibition history 
Solo exhibitions:

Rachel Feinstein: Maiden, Mother Crone, Jewish Museum (Manhattan), New York, NY, 2019
Rachel Feinstein: Secrets, Gagosian Gallery, Beverly Hills, CA, 2018
 Folly, Madison Square Park Conservancy, New York, NY, 2014
 Rachel Feinstein, Gagosian Gallery, Rome, Italy, 2012
 Rachel Feinstein: The Snow Queen, Lever House Art Collection, New York, NY, 2011
 Rachel Feinstein, Marianne Boesky Gallery, New York, NY, 2008
 Tropical Rodeo, Le Consortium, Dijon, France, 2006
 Art in the Atrium, organized by Art Production Fund, Sotheby's, New York, NY, 2002
 White Room: Rachel Feinstein, White Columns, New York, NY, 1999

Selected group exhibitions:

 People, Jeffrey Deitch, New York, NY, 2018
 SEED, Paul Kasmin Gallery, New York, NY, 2018
Naturalia, Paul Kasmin Gallery, New York, NY, 2017
The Seven Ages of Woman, Performa, New York, NY, 2016
No Longer / Not Yet, Minsheng Art Museum, Shanghai, China, 2015
More Material, Salon 94, New York, NY, 2014
L’Almanach 14, Le Consortium, Dijon, France, 2014
The Little Black Dress, SCAD Museum of Art, Savannah, GA, 2012
Something About Mary, The Metropolitan Opera, New York, NY, 2009
John Currin and Rachel Feinstein, Hydra Workshop, Hydra, Greece, 2002
Greater New York, Museum of Modern Art PS1, New York, NY, 2000
Let the Artist Live, Exit Art, New York, NY, 1994

References

External links
 Marianne Boesky Gallery list of Rachel Feinstein exhibitions and bibliography

American women sculptors
Artists from New York City
American libertarians
1971 births
Living people
Artists from Miami
Columbia College (New York) alumni
People from Fort Defiance, Arizona
Sculptors from New York (state)
Sculptors from Florida
21st-century American women artists
21st-century American comedians
People from Gramercy Park
Skowhegan School of Painting and Sculpture alumni